Najah Hassan Ali al-Shammari (born 20 January 1967) is an Iraqi politician and military officer who served as the Minister of Defense from June 2019 to May 2020. He holds Swedish citizenship.

Background 
Al-Shammari was born in Baghdad. He is a Sunni Arab and a member of the Shammar tribe (one of the largest and most influential Arab tribes). Al-Shammari graduated from the Iraqi Military Academy in 1987 with a bachelor's degree in military science. He also has a master's degree in strategic planning for national security. Al-Shammari later served as a commander in the Iraqi Special Operations Forces and has held many military positions from 2003 until 2007. He retired in 2018 with the rank of major general.

Defence minister 

On June 24, 2019, al-Shammari was approved by the Iraqi parliament as defence minister of Iraq in Adil Abdul-Mahdi's cabinet. He was nominated to the post by the al-Wataniya coalition, led by former prime minister and then vice president of Iraq Ayad Allawi.

Reports of dual Iraqi-Swedish citizenship and criminal charges in Sweden 
In April 2019, prior to the nomination of al-Shammari as a candidate for the post of defence minister, there were reports in Iraqi media that al-Shammari has dual Iraqi-Swedish citizenship. The claims were rejected as false by a representative of the al-Wataniya coalition.

In November 2019, Swedish news website Nyheter Idag reported that al-Shammari is a Swedish citizen registered as a resident in a Stockholm suburb under an alternative surname (this surname was reported to be the name of al-Shammari's clan within the Shammar tribe). According to the report, which was confirmed by Swedish authorities, al-Shammari applied for a residence permit in Sweden in 2009 and became a Swedish citizen in 2015. It was also reported that al-Shammari was granted several state welfare benefits in Sweden, including full time sick leave, while he did not declare any (or for some years only very low) income from work. He has also been the subject of several criminal investigations in Sweden, although he was never convicted of a crime.

Al-Shammari was also accused of sexually harassing a Swedish 20-year-old male while being Defense Minister in leaked text messages, although no other news sources have corroborated the allegation.

The Swedish police has launched a preliminary investigation into benefit fraud and civil registration violations against al-Shammari after allegedly claiming child and housing support for years despite living in Baghdad. The Swedish Prosecution Authority also announced that it had started an investigation for crimes against humanity against "an Iraqi minister", whom Swedish media identified as al-Shammari. Criminal charges have since been dropped and al-Shammari has returned to Sweden.

References

External links 
 

1967 births
Living people
Politicians from Baghdad
Iraqi generals
Defence ministers of Iraq